Black Clauchrie House is a late Victorian manor house, located on the outskirts of the village of Barrhill in South Ayrshire, Scotland, adjacent to the Galloway Forest Park. It is protected as a category C(s) listed building.

It was originally built as a hunting lodge between 1898 and 1901 in the Arts and Crafts style for Robert David Jardine Mein-Austin (1864–1910) and his wife Flora. The house was designed by the Ayrshire-based architect James K. Hunter (1863–1929). Some of its features include a wood-beamed glass house, a ballroom and a minstrels' gallery. Some of the house was taken down by owners Richard Akerman and Yvonne Hawker before 2003.

In 2009, Black Clauchrie House was the subject of a Channel 4 television documentary presented by hotelier Ruth Watson as part of the Country House Rescue series.

Sources
 Davis, Michael C (1991). The Castles and Mansions of Ayrshire. Ardrishaig, Argyll.

References

Houses completed in 1901
Category C listed buildings in South Ayrshire
Listed houses in Scotland
Arts and Crafts architecture in Scotland
Country houses in South Ayrshire
Hunting lodges in Scotland